The 6th Sarasaviya Awards festival (Sinhala: 6වැනි සරසවිය සම්මාන උලෙළ), presented by the Associated Newspapers of Ceylon Limited, was held to honor the best films of 1968 Sinhala cinema on March 26, 1969, at the Women's school premises, Colombo, Sri Lanka. Governor William Gopallawa was the chief guest at the awards night.

The film Golu Hadawatha won the most awards with four including Best Film.

Awards

References

Sarasaviya Awards
Sarasaviya